Ville Leskinen (born 29 July 1995) is a Finnish professional ice hockey winger who currently playing for HC Košice of the Slovak Extraliga.

Leskinen played in junior level for KalPa and Jokerit before joining Jukurit in 2016. He made his Liiga debut for Jukurit during the 2016–17 season, playing in nine games and scoring a goal and an assist.

Career statistics

References

External links

1995 births
Living people
Finnish ice hockey forwards
Iisalmen Peli-Karhut players
Imatran Ketterä players
Jokipojat players
Mikkelin Jukurit players
People from Pieksämäki
HKM Zvolen players
Sportspeople from South Savo
HC Košice players
Finnish expatriate ice hockey players in Slovakia